Am Byth is a compilation album by the Welsh band Ffa Coffi Pawb. It was released in 2004 and includes songs recorded by the band between 1986 and 1992.

Track listing
Original release in brackets.

References

2004 compilation albums
Ffa Coffi Pawb albums
Welsh-language albums